Yu Ruzhou (30 January 1899 – 18 March 1988) was a Chinese physician and politician. She was among the first group of women elected to the Legislative Yuan in 1948.

Biography
Yu was born in Acheng County in 1899. She attended Peking Union Medical College, Shanghai Medical College and the Shanghai Institute of Human and Obstetrics, after which she became a medical officer for the Harbin Anti-epidemic Affairs Office, Daheihe Epidemic Prevention Hospital and Daheihe Police Department. She later became head of Harbin Songjiang Obstetrics School and Songjiang Hospital. During the Second Sino-Japanese War she served as director of the Wartime Childcare Association and was deputy director of Yichang Wartime Children's Transportation Station.

After the war Yu was a delegate to the 1946  that drew up the constitution of the Republic of China. A member of the executive of the Harbin branch of the Kuomintang, she was a Kuomintang candidate in the city in the 1948 elections for the Legislative Yuan and was elected to parliament. She relocated to Taiwan during the Chinese Civil War, where she remained a member of the Legislative Yuan until her death in 1988.

References

1899 births
Peking Union Medical College alumni
Shanghai Medical College alumni
Chinese women physicians
Members of the Kuomintang
20th-century Chinese women politicians
Members of the 1st Legislative Yuan
Members of the 1st Legislative Yuan in Taiwan
1988 deaths
Physicians from Heilongjiang
Chinese public health doctors
Women public health doctors